Joes Creek is an unincorporated community and coal town located in Boone County, West Virginia, United States.

References

Unincorporated communities in Boone County, West Virginia
Unincorporated communities in West Virginia
Coal towns in West Virginia